Sebezhsky Uyezd (Себежский уезд) was one of the eleven subdivisions of the Vitebsk Governorate of the Russian Empire. It was situated in the central part of the governorate. Its administrative centre was Sebezh.

Demographics
At the time of the Russian Empire Census of 1897, Sebezhsky Uyezd had a population of 92,055. Of these, 47.1% spoke Russian, 47.1% Belarusian, 3.8% Yiddish, 1.5% Polish, 0.1% German, 0.1% Romani and 0.1% Lithuanian as their native language.

References

 
Uezds of Vitebsk Governorate